WJJN-LD, UHF digital channel 20 (virtual channel 49), is a low-powered independent  television station licensed to Dothan, Alabama, United States. The station is owned by Wilson Broadcasting, and has been on the air since 1995.

The station carries a mixture of sports, religious programming, and reruns of classic sitcoms.

Until May 2006, WJJN-LD was affiliated with Urban America Television, which folded that month.

External links

JJN-LD
1995 establishments in Alabama
Television channels and stations established in 1995
Low-power television stations in the United States